Manfred Winter (born 5 July 1954) is a German speed skater. He competed in the men's 5000 metres event at the 1976 Winter Olympics.

References

External links
 

1954 births
Living people
German male speed skaters
Olympic speed skaters of East Germany
Speed skaters at the 1976 Winter Olympics
People from Reichenbach im Vogtland
Sportspeople from Saxony